Carlo Luigi Grua (c. 1700 – 11 April 1773) was an Italian composer who is best known for his position as Kapellmeister for the Electoral Court at the German city of Mannheim.

Born in Milan, he was raised to the position in 1733 by Elector Karl III Philip, and held the position until his death.

His compositions during his tenure included sacred works, oratorios, and opera.

Grua died in Mannheim in 1773.

Works

Opera
Meride (1742), libretto by G. C. Pasquini.
La clemenza di Tito (1748), libretto by Metastasio.

Oratorios
La conversione di. S. Ignazio (1740), text by L. Santorini
Betsabea, ovvero il pentimento di David (1741)
Jaele (1741), text by L. Santorini
Il figliuol prodigo (1742, rev. 1749), text by G. C. Pasquini
La missione sacerdotale (1746), text by L. Santorini
S. Elena al Calvario (1750), text by Metastasio
La passione di Giesu Christo nostro Signore (1754), text by Metastasio

1700s births
1773 deaths
Year of birth uncertain
Musicians from Milan
18th-century Italian composers
Italian male composers
18th-century composers
18th-century Italian male musicians